Luaniva is an islet of Wallis and Futuna. It is located off the east coast of Mata-Utu, Wallis Island.

References

Islets of Wallis and Futuna